Kim Seung-Soo (born July 25, 1971) is a South Korean actor.

Filmography

Television series 
 Hur Jun (1999)
 Bad Boys (2000)
 Rookie (2000)
 Cool (2001)
 Mina (2001)
 Fox and Cotton Candy (2001)
 Remember (2002)
 Golden Pond (2002)
 Wife (2003)
 Sweetheart (2003)
 One Million Roses (2003)
 You are a Star (2004)
 My Sweetheart My Darling (2005)
 Jumong (2006)
 Kimcheed Radish Cubes (2007)
 Why Did You Come to My House (2008)
 Don't Ask Me About the Past (2008)
 Glass Castle (2008)
 Good Job, Good Job (2009)
 I Am Legend (2010)
 Gwanggaeto, The Great Conqueror (2011)
 Just Like Today (2012)
 Still You (2012)
 Cheongdam-dong Alice (2012)
 Who Are You? (2013) (guest appearance, ep 3-4, 13)
 A Little Love Never Hurts (2013)
 Family Secret (2014)
 The Merchant: Gaekju 2015 (2015) (guest appearance)
 Love in the Moonlight (2016)
 First Love Again (2017)
 Are You Human? (2018) (cameo)
 Sweet Munchies (2020)
 Kingmaker: The Change of Destiny (2020)
 Royal Secret Agent (2020) (guest appearance, ep 1, 3)
 Love Scene Number (2021)
 River Where the Moon Rises (2021)  (cameo)
 Show Window: The Queen's House (2021)
 Three Bold Siblings (2022) - Shin Moo-yeong
 Under the Queen's Umbrella (2022) - Park Kyung-woo 
 Delivery Man (2023) - Ji Chang-seok

Film 
 A Single Spark (1995)
 General Hospital the Movie: A Thousand Days (2000)
 My Heart (2000)
 Indream (TBA) - Sang Joon 
 Gochibang (unreleased)

Television shows

Awards

References

External links 
  
 
 

Living people
1973 births
South Korean male film actors
South Korean male television actors